Psychrolutes macrocephalus is a species of marine ray-finned fish belonging to the family Psychrolutidae, the fatheads. This is a bathydemersal fish which is found in the southeastern Atlantic from off the Northern and Western Cape of South Africa with reports from Namibia and Japan.

References

macrocephalus
Fish described in 1904
Taxa named by John Dow Fisher Gilchrist